Brian Folkerts (born January 30, 1990) is an American football center for the Arlington Renegades of the XFL. He played college football at Washburn.

Early years
Brian was born the son of Tim and Margie Folkerts. He attended Hazelwood Central High School in Florissant, Missouri. There he was a two-sport athlete, playing both football and wrestling.

College career
Folkerts attended Washburn University, where he played for the Washburn Ichabods football team from 2008 to 2011. Folkerts earned honorable mention All-Mid-America Intercollegiate Athletics Association (MIAA) as a freshman in 2008. As a sophomore in 2009, Folkerts was the Ichabods starting right tackle, earned second-team All-MIAA honors. During Folkerts junior season, he moved to left tackle, where he was named a first-team All-MIAA selection. His senior year, Folkerts was once again named a first-team All-MIAA selection, Folkerts also earned www.d2football.com's 2nd Team All-American honors in 2011.

Professional career

Pre-draft
Prior to the 2012 NFL Draft, Folkerts was projected to be undrafted by NFLDraftScout.com. He was rated as the fifty-first-best offensive guard in the draft. Folkerts was not invited to the 2012 NFL Scouting Combine in Indianapolis.

Folkerts attended the Kansas State Pro Day workout on March 27.

New Orleans Saints
After going undrafted in the 2012 NFL Draft, Folkerts signed as an undrafted free agent with the New Orleans Saints of the National Football League (NFL). Folkerts was cut by the Saints on August 27.

San Jose SaberCats
Folkerts was signed by the San Jose SaberCats of the Arena Football League for the 2013 season. Folkerts played fullback for the SaberCats. He was placed on Other League Exempt status by the SaberCats on May 16, when he signed with the NFL's Carolina Panthers.

Carolina Panthers
Folkerts survived the Panthers final cuts, and was placed on the active roster for Week 1 as a center. After the Panthers started the season 0-2, Folkerts was waived. He was re-signed to Panthers' practice squad on September 21, 2013. On September 5, 2015, he was released by the Panthers with an injury settlement.

San Francisco 49ers
On October 13, 2015, Folkerts was signed by the 49ers' practice squad.

St. Louis / Los Angeles Rams 
On November 17, 2015, Folkerts was signed by the St. Louis Rams from the 49ers' practice squad. On August 30, 2016, he was released by the Rams.

Carolina Panthers (second stint)
On August 12, 2017, Folkerts re-signed with the Panthers. He was waived on September 1, 2017.

San Antonio Commanders
On December 27, 2018, Folkerts signed with the San Antonio Commanders of the Alliance of American Football (AAF). The league ceased operations in April 2019.

St. Louis BattleHawks
In October 2019, Folkerts was selected in the second round of the 2020 XFL Draft by the St. Louis BattleHawks. He had his contract terminated when the league suspended operations on April 10, 2020.

Arlington Renegades 
On November 17, 2022, Folkharts was drafted by the Arlington Renegades of the XFL.

References

External links
Washburn Ichabods bio
Carolina Panthers bio

1990 births
Living people
American football offensive linemen
Arlington Renegades players
Carolina Panthers players
Los Angeles Rams players
New Orleans Saints players
People from Florissant, Missouri
Players of American football from Missouri
San Antonio Commanders players
San Francisco 49ers players
San Jose SaberCats players
Sportspeople from St. Louis County, Missouri
St. Louis BattleHawks players
St. Louis Rams players
Washburn Ichabods football players